Rocío Marengo (born March 25, 1971)is an Argentinian model, actress, vedette, comedian and dancer.

Early life and career
Marengo early television experience includes co-hosting Mar de Fondo with Alejandro Fantino on TyC Sports.

She participated as a showgirl in Moria Casán journals, work that took her to Chile in 2004. Channel 13 in Chile offered her work as a model on the program Mucho Lucho. She left the show to get married and live in a hotel in Chile for a few months.

Marengo love life is frequently covered by the Argentine press and has contributed to her high profile. Reported relationships with TV host Alejandro "Marley" Wiebe and the son of Argentinian star Graciela Alfano have been reported on, and she also made headlines with her alleged affair with football star Mauricio Pinilla.  Other relationships have been regular press fodder in Argentina.

Television and other appearances

In 2006, she participated in the reality TV show Expedition Robinson, the island VIP, which developed on a beach in the Dominican Republic, where she finished in fourth place. Later she participated in the program Locos por el baile.

In 2007, she appeared on season four of Bailando por un Sueño, a dance competition portion of the television program Showmatch,  hosted by Marcelo Tinelli.  She danced to "El Baile del Koala", in a routine that involved a woman breaking a man's pelvis, making moves on his waist, and mimicking sexual intercourse.  Marengo was eliminated from the contest during the Rumba Flamenca and Quartet week.

In February 2008, she participated in the program with the satellite Viña festival, National Television of Chile. In August of that year she began the skating for A Dream and was the runner-up. She also participated in works of Gerardo Sofovich.

In 2009 she acted in a play in which her character quickly becomes a success. That same year she co-lead with Gerardo Sofovich Sunday night and was invited by the Chilean TV channel Chilevision on Wednesday 15 July the same year as the program Dance Fever as a replacement for Marlen Olivari.

In 2011, Marengo returned to Bailando por un Sueño (season eight), but was eliminated in the first week of competition.

In 2017, she participated in the reality TV show "Doble Tentación" in Chile, where she finished being a semifinalist.

Filmography

References

External links
 

1980 births
Living people
Argentine actresses
Argentine female models
Argentine expatriates in Chile
Expatriate models in Chile
Argentine vedettes
Argentine musical theatre actresses
Argentine musical theatre female dancers
People from Bahía Blanca
Participants in Argentine reality television series
Bailando por un Sueño (Argentine TV series) participants